In number theory, the totient summatory function   is a summatory function of Euler's totient function defined by:

It is the number of coprime integer pairs .

Properties 
Using Möbius inversion to the totient function, we obtain

 has the asymptotic expansion

where  is the Riemann zeta function for the value 2.

 is the number of coprime integer pairs .

The summatory of reciprocal totient function 
The summatory of reciprocal totient function is defined as

Edmund Landau showed in 1900 that this function has the asymptotic behavior

where  is the Euler–Mascheroni constant,

and

The constant  is sometimes known as Landau's totient constant. The sum  is convergent and equal to:

In this case, the product over the primes in the right side is a constant known as totient summatory constant, and its value is:

See also 
Arithmetic function

References

External links
Totient summatory function 
 Decimal expansion of totient constant product(1 + 1/(p^2*(p-1))), p prime >= 2)

Arithmetic functions